Timothy Childs Jr. (January 1, 1790 – November 25, 1847) was a U.S. Representative from New York. He represented Monroe County for eight non-consecutive terms in Congress between 1829 and 1843.

Early life
Childs was born in Pittsfield, Massachusetts on January 1, 1790.  He was the son of Rachel (née Easton) Childs (1760–1852) and Timothy Childs (1748–1821), a Revolutionary War officer who studied at Harvard, became a physician and served in the Massachusetts House of Representatives.

He graduated from Williams College in 1811 and Litchfield Law School in 1814.  He completed his studies at the Albany firm of Harmanus Bleecker, afterwards practicing law in New York, first in Canandaigua, and then in Rochester.

Career
Originally a Federalist, while residing in Canandaigua, Childs served in offices including Ontario County Commissioner and the judicial position of Master in Chancery.

He served as Monroe County, New York District Attorney from 1821 to 1831, the first to hold this position.  He served as a member of the New York State Assembly in 1828, and in the late 1820s he also served as Monroe County Judge.

Childs was elected as an Anti-Mason to the Twenty-first Congress (March 4, 1829 – March 3, 1831).  After his term expired he returned to practicing law in Rochester.

In 1833, he was elected again to the New York State Assembly.

In 1834, he was elected as an Anti-Jacksonian to the Twenty-fourth Congress.  He was reelected as a Whig in 1836, and served from March 4, 1835 to March 3, 1839.  During his 1837 to 1839 term Childs was appointed Chairman of the Committee on Expenditures in the Post Office Department.

Childs was elected to Congress again as a Whig in 1840 and served one term, March 4, 1841 to March 3, 1843. He resumed practicing law following the completion of his final term in Congress.

Death and burial
In the late 1840s, Childs traveled to Saint Croix, where he went in an effort to improve his health.  He died aboard the ship Emily on November 25, 1847 while en route from Saint Croix to the United States.  Childs was buried in Pittsfield Cemetery in Pittsfield, Massachusetts.

Personal life
In 1817, he married Catherine Adams.

In December 1830 he married Louisa Stewart (née Shepherd) Dickinson of North Carolina in a ceremony in Norfolk, Virginia.  Louisa was the widow of Joel Dickinson.

References

External links

Timothy Childs, Jr., Litchfield Historical Society, The Ledger: A Database of Students of the Litchfield Law School and the Litchfield Female Academy
 

1790 births
1847 deaths
Politicians from Pittsfield, Massachusetts
New York (state) Federalists
Anti-Masonic Party members of the United States House of Representatives from New York (state)
New York (state) National Republicans
National Republican Party members of the United States House of Representatives
Whig Party members of the United States House of Representatives from New York (state)
19th-century American politicians
Members of the New York State Assembly
New York (state) state court judges
New York (state) lawyers
Politicians from Rochester, New York
Williams College alumni
Litchfield Law School alumni
People who died at sea
Lawyers from Rochester, New York
19th-century American judges
19th-century American lawyers